Andrei Gennadyevich Miroshnichenko (born 21 December 1968) is a Kazakhstani professional football coach and a former player. He is a technical director with FC Tobol.

Club career
He made his professional debut in the Soviet Second League in 1986 for FC Druzhba Maykop.

Honours
 Russian Premier League runner-up: 1993.
 Kazakhstan Premier League champion: 1995.
 Kazakhstan Premier League top scorer: 1995 (23 goals).
 Kazakhstani Footballer of the Year: 1995.

References

1968 births
Living people
Sportspeople from Krasnodar
Russian footballers
Soviet footballers
Association football forwards
Russian emigrants to Kazakhstan
Kazakhstani footballers
Kazakhstani expatriate footballers
Kazakhstan international footballers
Russian Premier League players
Kazakhstan Premier League players
FC Salyut Belgorod players
FC Aktobe players
FC Rotor Volgograd players
FC Irtysh Pavlodar players
Expatriate footballers in Russia
FC Lada-Tolyatti players
FC Kairat players
Kazakhstani football managers
Russian expatriate sportspeople in Kazakhstan
Russian people of Ukrainian descent
FC Armavir players
FC Aktobe managers
FC Vostok managers
FC Tobol managers